Diplacus whitneyi is a species of monkeyflower known by the common name Harlequin monkeyflower. It was formerly known as Mimulus lewisii.

Distribution and habitat
Diplacus whitneyi is endemic to the southern Sierra Nevada of California, such as below the Mount Whitney area.  It grows in bare and disturbed habitat, such as exposed talus slopes and roadsides.

Description
Diplacus whitneyi is an herb growing up to about 14 centimeters tall. The oval to linear leaves reach up to 2.3 centimeters long. The tubular base of the flower is encapsulated in a dark-ribbed calyx of hairy sepals with pointed lobes.

The flower corolla is between 1 and 2 centimeters in length and may be pink or yellow. It generally has longitudinal stripes in the mouth.

References

External links
Jepson Manual Treatment - Mimulus whitneyi
USDA Plants Profile: Mimulus whitneyi
Mimulus whitneyi Photo gallery

whitneyi
Endemic flora of California
Flora of the Sierra Nevada (United States)
Natural history of Inyo County, California
Flora without expected TNC conservation status